Danilo Cocks (born 17 August 1995) is a Saint Martin international footballer who plays for the Saint Martin national football team.

Career statistics

International

International goals
Scores and results list Saint Martin's goal tally first.

References

External links
 
 Danilo Cocks at Caribbean Football Database

1995 births
Living people
Association football forwards
Saint Martinois footballers
Saint Martin international footballers
Saint Martin youth international footballers